The Camden Brewers were an American basketball team based in Camden, New Jersey that was a member of the American Basketball League.

The team was previously known as the Hoboken Thourots who moved to Camden during the 1st half of the 1933/34 season. After 8 games, the team was taken over and became the New Britain Palaces on January 10, 1934.

Year-by-year

Basketball teams in New Jersey
Sports in Camden, New Jersey
1933 establishments in New Jersey